Haa Dhaalu Atoll is the code name based on the letters of the Maldivian alphabet commonly used to refer to the administrative division (known as "Atoll") officially known as South Thiladhunmathi Atoll (Maldivian: Thiladhunmathi Dhekunuburi) in the Maldives. 

The administrative division consists of the southern section of natural Thiladhunmathi Atoll (which is shared with North Thiladhunmathi (Haa Alifu) Atoll) and Makunudhoo or Maamakunudhoo Atoll (Malcolm Atoll in the Admiralty Charts) with its large reef.

The capital of the administrative division is Kulhudhuffushi.

Islands

History
Thiladhunmathi Atoll was divided into northern and southern divisions on 21 May 1958, thus creating the South Thiladhunmathi Atoll administrative division. The northern part of the atoll became North Thiladhunmati Atoll.

The capital of South Thiladhunmathi Atoll was Nolhivaranfaru before it was moved to Kulhudhuffushi on May 6, 1992.

Transport
South Thiladhunmathi is linked by air with the Maldivian capital of Malé as there are two airports in the atoll. one in Hanimaadhoo, (which is an international airport) and a domestic airport in Kulhudhuffushi. As well as dhoani's are used for transportation of cargo and people between Malé.

References

 Divehi Tārīkhah Au Alikameh. Divehi Bahāi Tārikhah Khidmaiykurā Qaumī Markazu. Reprint 1958 edn. Malé 1990. 
 Divehiraajjege Jōgrafīge Vanavaru. Muhammadu Ibrahim Lutfee. G.Sōsanī.
 Xavier Romero-Frias, The Maldive Islanders, A Study of the Popular Culture of an Ancient Ocean Kingdom. Barcelona 1999.

Administrative atolls of the Maldives
Atolls of the Maldives